Tabulaephorus parthicus is a moth of the family Pterophoridae. It is found in Asia Minor, Iran, Jordan, Syria and Afghanistan.

The wingspan is about 22 mm. The forewings are creamy white with a brownish-yellow stripe.

References

Moths described in 1870
Pterophorini
Insects of Turkey